Jerry Springer is an American syndicated tabloid talk show that aired from September 30, 1991, to July 26, 2018. Produced and hosted by its namesake, Jerry Springer, it aired for 27 seasons and nearly 5,000 episodes. The television series was produced and aired by NBCUniversal and CW for over 26 years, peaking in popularity around 1997 and 1998 among a predominantly American audience.

The program was unsuccessful in ratings in its first seasons due to its focus on more political issues. This led to an overhaul of the structure which by the mid-1990s led to the show as it is known now, filled with controversial topics (such as incest and adultery), profanity, physical fights (involving a mixture of boxing and wrestling), nudity, and scantily clad guests.

The show premiered on September 30, 1991. It was taped in Chicago, Illinois from 1991 to 2009 and in Stamford, Connecticut, from 2009 to 2018. On June 13, 2018, NBCUniversal ended production of new episodes of the show after 27 seasons. The show's final tapings took place on July 6, 2018, and its final episode aired on July 26, 2018, with reruns continuing on The CW immediately thereafter. The CW retains rights to produce new episodes. After the cancellation, it was announced that Springer would host a new courtroom show titled Judge Jerry, which premiered on September 9, 2019, and is also distributed by NBCUniversal; it was canceled after three seasons in 2022.

Critical response to the show was mostly negative, and in 2002, TV Guide proclaimed it to be the worst TV show of all time. This critique of the show as "trash TV", however, was satirically embraced by the show with the host, Springer, proudly introducing the program as the "worst TV show of all time" at the start of each episode. Thus the program was recognised as "the most infamous guilty pleasure" in American television throughout the late '90s to early 2000s.

Production

Format
Each episode of Jerry Springer began with Springer entering the stage and being greeted by a standing audience (made up of mostly college students) pumping the air with their right hand, chanting "Jerry!, Jerry!". Beginning in the 2000s, Springer would arrive on stage by sliding down a stripper pole. He then shook hands with some of the audience members before introducing the episode's topic and guests. The topics were usually of an unsophisticated nature, such as infidelity and other relationship squabbles. Oftentimes the guests would become emotional and get involved in heated arguments with one another, resulting in outbursts and physical fighting. On-screen security guards were present and tasked with managing the potential violence.

Once all the guests had told their stories, there was usually a "question and answer" segment where audience members asked guests questions. In earlier seasons, the questions tended to be serious. However, these questions gave way to insults as the show progressed. Throughout the show, some women in the audience would sometimes flash their breasts in exchange for "Jerry Beads" (Mardi Gras-style beads with the show logo). In later seasons, serious questions were typically mocked by the crowd with chants of "Go to Oprah!". Springer then ended the show by giving a formal lecture, sitting by himself on the stage, on the principles of refined values in regards to the featured guests. Springer's "final thought" segment ended with the concluding statement, "Till next time, take care of yourselves and each other," which was his sign-off line during his days as a newscaster in Cincinnati.

Generally, Springer tended to present his program standing up, pacing the aisle steps between the seating areas, rather than having a podium or mark on the main stage. This was thought to be to protect himself from the potential violence occurring on the stage. He deliberately chose a role as straight man; he never directly involved himself in the arguments. "I'm always wearing a suit, I don't curse and I wasn't in fights involving Jell-O," Springer stated in retrospective.

Sometimes the show would have a look back at previous episodes. They had rebranded as Classic Springer, some with a false Masterpiece Theatre-like theme and patina. These shows were interspersed with commentary from Springer himself, usually before and after commercial breaks.

Set

According to NBC, the set for the show has had three major changes over the years. When the show first started in 1991, it was very basic with white walls, in an effort to capture the feel of fellow talk show Donahue, Jerry's haircut and glasses even seeming to make him look like Phil Donahue. The general look of this set was carried over when the series first moved to Chicago in September 1992, with an unpolished, open air look and bright colored shapes.

In the fall of 1994, a few months after the series underwent its format overhaul, the studio received a makeover to make it look a bit warmer and more inviting, complete with brick walls, artwork, and bookcases. The stage walls were designed so that they could be projected outward into the audience, making room for a catwalk that was used in shows such as the 1997 episode Stripper Wars! In late 2000, the whole set was changed to its "industrial" look, changes initially welcomed due to the reduced ratings of the 1999–2000 season. In 2007 the set was slightly changed, with a larger studio audience, bigger stage, and a balcony, which was above the stage and ended at the pole. Springer used this as his main entrance by sliding down the pole. The logo and stage design were carried across to the new studio in Stamford, Connecticut, with only a few changes and stayed as such until the end of the run.

History

1991
Jerry Springer debuted on September 30, 1991, with a family reunion as the topic of its first show. Initially, Jerry Springer was distributed by Multimedia Entertainment, later going to the former Universal and then to Studios USA.

Originally seen in only the five markets where Multimedia owned TV stations (Cincinnati, Macon, St. Louis, Cleveland and Knoxville), it was dramatically different from the later version of the show. It started as an issues-oriented and political talk show, a longer version of the commentary for which Springer had gained local fame as a reporter and anchor (not unlike Donahue during this time), and for its first season, was even taped at Springer's former station, WLWT in Cincinnati. Guests early on included Oliver North and Jesse Jackson, and the topics included homelessness and gun politics, as well as the social effects of rock music, featuring shock rock star GG Allin, El Duce from The Mentors and GWAR as guests.

1992–1999
For its second season in the fall of 1992, the series was purchased by the NBC owned-and-operated stations, thus allowing it to finally achieve full national distribution, and production was moved to its longtime home at Chicago's NBC Tower (with Springer leaving his longtime position at WLWT in order to do so). Series creator and original executive producer Burt Dubrow became Senior Vice-president at Multimedia Entertainment and continued to oversee the show, while bringing in Terry Weible Murphy to become the EP. In April 1994, Multimedia threatened cancellation if ratings didn't improve by that November, which led to a major overhaul that saw Murphy's departure and replacement by fellow Jerry Springer producer Richard Dominick, under Dubrow's purview.

The search for higher ratings led the program gradually towards provocative topics, becoming more successful as it became geared towards youthful viewers (modeled after Ricki Lake's popular talk show) by introducing more controversial topics. However, there were still some traditional and serious topics featured on the show at this time, even with the format change.

By December 1994, the show started featuring such topics as "My boyfriend turned out to be a girl" and "I want my man to stop watching porn!", as well as investigating which are sexier: bigger or smaller breasts on women.

In 1995, there were two performances by Comedy Central transgender star Jade Esteban Estrada. It became a "freak show" where guests seek their 15 minutes of fame through discussion and demonstrations of deviant behavior. In 1996, Springer wanted people to send him videotapes explaining why they wanted Springer to tape a show in their home. Its extraordinary success has led it to be broadcast in dozens of countries. The show gained so much popularity that for a while it was the top-rated daytime talk show in the United States.

In 1998, several stations that carried Jerry Springer, including WLWT in Cincinnati where Springer was a news anchor, refused to carry the episode "I Married A Horse", which led to it being pulled before airing. The same year, Barry Diller, the head of Jerry Springer parent company Studios USA, would order the producers of Jerry Springer to end the show's trademark scripted brawls among guests amid growing controversy.  However, this decision didn't appear to damage the show's ratings too much, with the show finishing only one-tenth behind longtime daytime talk show leader Oprah by July 1999.

In 1999, the show was parodied in the film Austin Powers: The Spy Who Shagged Me, with Dr. Evil and his son Scott discussing being evil.  Along with Jerry, Steve Wilkos and Todd Schultz played themselves in the movie.

Early 2000s
In 2000, Springer was given a five-year, $30 million contract extension paying him $6 million per year. The same year, a married couple, Ralf and Eleanor Panitz, were guests on an episode of the show entitled "Secret Mistresses Confronted" with Mr. Panitz's ex-wife, Nancy Campbell-Panitz, in which they complained about Ms. Campbell-Panitz's behavior and accused her of stalking them. Hours after it was broadcast on July 24, 2000, Ms. Campbell-Panitz was found dead in a home that the three were fighting over, and Florida police soon confirmed that they were treating the death as a homicide. It was then reported that Mr. Panitz, having been issued a first-degree murder warrant for the death, was trying to flee to Canada to avoid prosecution. Upon news of the 52-year-old woman's murder, a spokeswoman for the program issued a statement saying that it was "a terrible tragedy".

In August 2000, Springer appeared on CNN's Larry King Live to discuss the incident, claiming that it "had nothing to do with the show" and that his talk show does not glamorize deviant behavior. On March 27, 2002, after a 10-day trial and 18 hours of deliberating from jurors, Mr. Panitz was convicted of the murder and sentenced to life in prison.

In 2001, efforts by groups like the Parents Television Council and the American Family Association forced some advertisers to decrease or to stop their sponsorship of Jerry Springer. In the United Kingdom, the Independent Television Commission banned Jerry Springer and other tabloid talk programs from being shown on television during daytime hours on school holidays in response to numerous parental complaints and concerns about children's potential exposure to the salacious content (there was a short-running British version of the show made for ITV called The Springer Show that was lighter and more tongue-in-cheek). The show also topped TV Guide magazine's 2002 list of "The Worst TV Shows Ever"; for a time, the show itself would even frequently boast about this ranking in its opening credits as a form of self-deprecation.

In 2003, a British opera inspired by the series, Jerry Springer: The Opera, began playing in the United Kingdom. The same year, it was revealed that a group of guests from Hayward, California, faked a "love triangle" for an appearance on two episodes of the show; one guest in the group was murdered, but Hayward police determined that his appearance was not connected to his murder.

By 2005, security director Steve Wilkos became a cult figure on his own, and would close each show walking down a hallway engaging in casual talk with one of the more colorful guests of the preceding episode. He also would occasionally host the show. Episodes that he hosted were intended to be more serious in tone than the typical episode of Jerry Springer. Wilkos left Jerry Springer at the end of the 2006–2007 season to pursue his own talk show, The Steve Wilkos Show.

Mid-2000s
In 2005, the program became a subject of criticism in Bernard Goldberg's book 100 People Who Are Screwing Up America, being called "TV's lowest life-form" and Springer himself being ranked at 32 and labeled an "American Pioneer". Goldberg also claimed that Springer was knowingly capitalizing on the disadvantages of his guests and the stupidity of his audience, also citing the controversial episode revolving around the man who married his horse.

In January 2006, the show was renewed for its sixteenth season, ending speculation that Springer would leave his talk show to run for elected office in Ohio, where he briefly served as mayor of Cincinnati in the late 1970s. By this time, the show began to poke fun at itself by using the taglines "An Hour of Your Life You'll Never Get Back" and "Wasting Technology Since 1991". On May 12, 2006, Springer celebrated his show's 3,000th episode by throwing a party on the show (which no one but Jerry showed up to humorously), and showed many clips, including rare excerpts from the show. 2006 also saw the addition of fan favorite Reverend Shnorr, a drunken womanizing character who would often get into heated confrontations with guests while bringing a fresh comedic edge to the show. The character was created by then-promotions director Brian Schnoor while studying Improv at Chicago's famed Second City Theater in the 1990s. By December 2007, Rev. Shnorr merchandise was out-selling the show's popular security T-shirts on NBC's website.

In the United Kingdom, meanwhile, a Commercial High Court trial was scheduled for summer 2006 to resolve a dispute between Flextech Television and NBCUniversal over Flextech in 2002 cancelling its 1998 contract to broadcast Jerry Springer in the UK as long as new episodes continued to be produced in the U.S.

In 2007, security director Wilkos left Jerry Springer to host his own syndicated talk show. The Steve Wilkos Show was also shot at the NBC Tower in Chicago and produced by Richard Dominick, who continued to produce Jerry Springer as well. On July 15, 2007, it was announced that Springer was picked up by NBC-Universal through the 2009–2010 season. Also, VH1 ran a documentary series The Springer Hustle, going "behind the scenes" of the show, having already run another Springer-related documentary in 2005 titled When Jerry Springer Ruled the World. Springer's appearance on the NBC television network show America's Got Talent led to an increase in viewership for the first quarter of 2007. Steve Wilkos filled in for Springer during the beginning of America's Got Talent.

The security staff for the program also was given new additions, as starting in the seventeenth season, three female security guards were added. Certain professional athletes have come on the show as one-off security guards for some episodes. They include hockey players Joe Corvo and Adam Burish, and mixed martial arts fighters Andrei Arlovski, Shonie Carter, and Bas Rutten.

While certain advertisers continued to avoid buying ad time for Jerry Springer, the series continued to keep steady ratings in the February 2008 "Sweeps" period.

Executive producer Richard Dominick resigned shortly after the start of the 18th season; Rachelle Consiglio, wife of Steve Wilkos and longtime Senior Producer, replaced Dominick. The set decorations added during the 17th season were removed.

2009–2018
On May 19, 2009, the show recorded its last episode at WMAQ-TV's NBC Tower in Chicago, Illinois, where it had been videotaped since 1992, midway through the second season. Beginning with the 2009–10 season, production was moved to the Rich Forum at the Stamford Center for the Arts in Stamford, Connecticut, after NBCUniversal received tax credits from the state of Connecticut to move Springer, along with Maury and Steve Wilkos to the state, along with NBC Sports. Jerry was quoted as saying he was not happy with the move, but understood the financial reasons for which it was being done, and was working to secure jobs for those on his staff who wished to move with the show. After moving to Stamford, the show went through a number of changes; the set became more highly colored with new lighting, new chairs for guests, two new security guards, and a change to its iconic theme music.

The show aired its 20th anniversary episode, which was taped in Times Square, on October 27, 2010. Jerry Springers twenty-first season premiered on September 19, 2011, debuting new graphics. On September 17, 2012, Jerry Springer began airing in widescreen and 1080i, in conjunction with its 22nd-season premiere.

In October 2014, it was announced that the show had been renewed by NBC Universal through September 2018. The 25th season of Jerry Springer began on September 21, 2015. With the 25th season anniversary of the show, Rachelle Wilkos, wife of Steve Wilkos departed as the executive producer of the show. Wilkos would transition full-time as the executive producer of her husband's show, as Kerry Shannon, another longtime producer, was promoted as the show's new executive producer. Despite her departure from the show, Wilkos briefly remained with the show as a consultant.

End of production and move to The CW (2018–2021)
On June 13, 2018, the industry publication Broadcasting & Cable reported that the series had ceased production and that the 2018–19 season forward would solely consist of reruns. The last first-run episode aired on July 26, 2018. Springer had originally intended to retire after the show ended production; instead, NBCUniversal, interested in keeping his services, convinced him into working on a new courtroom show, to be called Judge Jerry.

The CW acquired rerun rights to the show to fill an hour in their daytime timeslot that previously aired The Robert Irvine Show. The CW, which began airing the show on September 10, 2018, has first right to the episodes that have been produced but remain unaired, which number in the "dozens". The CW also had the right to ask that production of the series be revived in the future. The CW announced its intent to end its reruns of Springer in September 2021 as a reorganizing of its programming lineup (replacing its daytime block with a Saturday night lineup, which neither the CW nor its predecessors have programmed since they launched in 1995).

An additional block of reruns was offered to Springer's existing affiliate base for the 2018–19 season; those still carrying that rerun block transitioned to Springer's above-mentioned new show Judge Jerry on September 9, 2019.

Controversies over authenticity and violence
In the late 1990s, the show was quite popular and controversial, so much so that it caused contemporaries like Jenny Jones, Maury Povich, Montel Williams, and Ricki Lake to "revamp" their own shows in order to improve ratings. However, major figures in television, along with many religious leaders, had called for the show's removal and considered it to be of bad taste. The phrase "Jerry Springer Nation" began to be used by some who see the program as being a bad influence on the morality of the United States.

In 1997 and 1998, the show reached its ratings peak, at one point becoming the first talk show in years to beat The Oprah Winfrey Show. It featured almost non-stop fighting between guests—5 to 12 per day during one April 1998 week—and religious figures and even other TV personalities complained. Chicago City Council suggested that if the fistfights and chair-throwing were real, then the guests should be arrested for committing acts of violence in the city, as alderman Ed Burke was concerned over the fact that the off-duty Chicago police officers serving as security guards for the program failed to take legal action against fighting guests. Springer explained that the violence on the program "look[ed] real" to him, also arguing that the fighting on the show "never, ever, ever glamorizes violence". Ultimately, the City Council chose not to pursue the matter. Because of this probe and other external and internal pressures, the fighting was taken off the show temporarily before being allowed again in a less violent nature. In the years of the show having toned down the fights, viewership declined but remained respectable by the newer standards of daytime television ratings.

There had been continuous debate over the authenticity of the fighting. In an interview, a production assistant stated that "we try our hardest to screen people," and inauthentic-seeming guests had been kicked off stage. Marvin Kitman, television critic for the Newsday newspaper, felt that the fighting had been choreographed beforehand. Christopher Sterling of the George Washington University media department compared the program to professional wrestling; some producers later claimed the fights on the show were inspired by the fights and angles in the WWE. Sixteen former guests of Jerry Springer, who were interviewed on various U.S. media outlets such as the entertainment news program Extra, Rolling Stone, and the New York Post newspaper, claimed there was a "fight quota" for each episode, and that they and other guests were encouraged to fight one another. In the past, producers  booked professional wrestlers such as The Iron Sheik, Razor Ramon (albeit in a non-fighting role), Jamie Dundee, 2 Tuff Tony, Madman Pondo, and One Man Kru (also a hip hop artist), as well as lady wrestlers and midget wrestlers; one guest would be a then-unknown Justin Roberts, then-primary ring announcer for WWE. Springer would later make guest appearances during WWE Raw on two occasions.

In screening potential cases for his next show Judge Jerry, Springer deliberately chose a process that picks cases from those that have already been filed, to prevent would-be litigants from seeking out the show as had been suspected with Jerry Springer.

Springer stated in an October 2000 interview with the Reuters news agency:

Censorship

Jerry Springer aired on various stations in the United States at various times of the day, whether in the morning, the afternoon, or the late night hours. All syndicated episodes of Jerry Springer were censored, regardless of time, to comply with Federal Communications Commission (FCC) broadcast decency standards.

Initially, most profanity was bleeped, but later episodes were bleeped for explicit language, sometimes to such an extent that speech became incomprehensible; along with the mouth being spot-blurred so that viewers could not read lips. In addition, nudity, flashing of breasts, buttocks, and genital areas; as well as the middle finger was pixelated. After longtime producer Richard Dominick left, the show reverted to the traditional style of bleeping, which remains in place today. A New York Times report from April 1998 found that each episode had about 85 to 130 bleeps.

Springer himself had stated that, while his show was a bit wild, there were certain things that were not permitted. The audience was not allowed to shout anything that encouraged or sustained violence among the guests. Furniture could be pushed aside, but the chairs were purposely large to preclude their use as a weapon. Men being violent against women was never acceptable, on- or off-camera; in Ringmaster, Springer mentioned that he always asked if the woman wanted to press charges.

Spinoffs

Too Hot for TV

During the show's most popular era in the late 1990s, Jerry Springer released videotapes and later DVDs marketed as Too Hot for TV. They contained uncensored nudity, profanity, and violence that was edited out of broadcasts in order to conform to FCC standards for broadcast decency. The releases sold and rented remarkably well and inspired similar sets from other series. Eventually, the show started producing similar "uncensored" monthly pay-per-view/video on demand specials as well as part of In Demand's Too Much for TV brand of PPV/on-demand content.

In 2015, Springer brought the Too Hot for TV format to the WWE Network for a series of episodes featuring WWE's most controversial segments.

The Springer Show
In 1999, ITV made 12 UK-based version episodes of the series Jerry Springer UK, filmed at the same studios as his US show.

In 2005, another UK version was shown made for ITV titled The Springer Show as a replacement for Trisha Goddard, which defected to Channel 5. Initially Springer only signed a one-month deal. It beat its talk-show rival Trisha Goddard five to one in the ratings, despite it being a subdued and more tongue-in-cheek version of the U.S. show. The series was broadcast from June 6, 2005, until July 1, with the remaining 10 episodes broadcast from September 5 until September 16, 2005, when The Jeremy Kyle Show fully replaced the show.

Ça va se savoir!
From 2002 to 2008, a French-Belgian version of the show was produced, hosted by Simon Monceau. For most of its run, it was produced and recorded in Belgium. Contrary to the original version, Ça va se savoir ! clearly made public that the show's guests were in fact actors, which was also indicated during the end titles.

Other versionsLegend:'''  Currently airing  Ended  Unknown version  

See also

 Shock value
 Kenny Easterday Jerry Springer: The Opera Maury The Jeremy Kyle Show (UK)
 The Jeremy Kyle Show (U.S. TV series) Face to Face (Philippine talk show) The Steve Wilkos Show Trisha Goddard (TV series) (UK)
 The Trisha Goddard Show WWE

References

External links
 
 
 Jerry Springer facts - a new Chicago interview JerrySpringer.org, November 11, 2008 - Jerry offers up facts on revamped Jerry Springer Show''
 ‘Springer,’ ‘Wilkos,’ ‘Maury’ to Tape in Connecticut Broadcasting & Cable, February 27, 2009

1991 American television series debuts
2018 American television series endings
1990s American television talk shows
2000s American television talk shows
2010s American television talk shows
English-language television shows
First-run syndicated television programs in the United States
Television controversies in the United States
Television series by Universal Television
Television franchises
The CW original programming
Television shows adapted into films
Television shows adapted into plays
Television shows filmed in Connecticut
Culture of Stamford, Connecticut
Obscenity controversies in television